Carl David Hanniwell (May 28, 1903 – April 22, 1969) was a Canadian politician who served as a Progressive Conservative Party of Ontario member of the Ontario legislature and as a municipal politician.

He served as an alderman and later as mayor of the city of Niagara Falls, Ontario. He was mayor from 1938 until 1939. He was elected to the 22nd Legislative Assembly of Ontario in 1945, serving from June 4, 1945, until April 27, 1948. Later, he was vice-chairman of Ontario Hydro.

References

1903 births
1969 deaths
Progressive Conservative Party of Ontario MPPs
Mayors of Niagara Falls, Ontario